The Memotech MTX500, MTX512 and RS128 are a series of Zilog Z80A processor-based home computers released by Memotech in 1983 and 1984.

Design 

The MTX500 had 32 KB of RAM, the MTX512 had 64KB, and the RS128 had 128KB. Although the Z80A could only address a maximum of 64KB at a time, the MTX and RS128's extra memory, up to a maximum of 768KB, was accessible through the technique of page switching. All models had 24KB of ROM accessible in the first 16KB of address space. The extra 8KB of ROM was available through page switching. The ROM could be switched out entirely, allowing the full 16-bit address space to be used for RAM.

The computers featured an all-aluminum case and full-size keyboard with real keys (unlike the chiclet keyboard used on the ZX Spectrum).  In addition to the standard (for the time) BASIC language interpreter (with rudimentary windowing support and LOGO commands support), it included some other software: an assembler, the Panel disassembler/debugger and the Noddy graphic language aimed at children)

Peripherals 

This series also featured support for plug-in ROM cartridges (a little like the BBC Micro). The most popular of these was the ISO Pascal language from HiSoft which was much faster than interpreted BASIC. A considerable addition to any Memotech system was the hugely expensive FDX system which added 5.25" floppy disk drives, Winchester hard disks and CP/M 2.2 operating system. A Memotech-badged CGA monitor was also made available around the time of the FDX launch.

Specifications 

 CPU: Zilog Z80A @ 4MHz
 Video: TM9918 or 9928 (256 x 192 resolution, 16 colors)
 Sound:  SN76489A (3 voices + pink noise, 6 octaves)
 RAM: 32 KB (MTX-500) / 64 to 512 KB (MTX-512)
 OS: CP/M

References

External links 

 MTX information and reviews - some text , content mostly 
 MTX family at old-computers.com
 Review of MTX512 originally from Creative Computing
 Memotech MTX 512 - The Russian Schools Bid

Early microcomputers
Z80-based home computers
Home computers
Computers designed in the United Kingdom